"Hit That Perfect Beat" is a song by British synthpop trio Bronski Beat from their second album, Truthdare Doubledare (1986). It reached number three on the UK Singles Chart in January 1986 and entered the top 10 in several European countries, Australia, and South Africa.

Music video
The video for the song featured frontman and vocalist John Foster in the video seeking to join the group after reading an advert in a newspaper and fronts an audition to join the group. The video also features the other two band members playing with Foster at a Liverpool club called "The State" as well as scenes from in and around Stanley Dock, and flashes from the 1985 film Letter to Brezhnev.

Track listings

Charts

Weekly charts

Year-end charts

Certifications

References

1985 singles
1985 songs
Bronski Beat songs
London Records singles